The 450s decade ran from January 1, 450, to December 31, 459.

Significant people

References